Diamide may refer to:

 Diamide, any chemical compound containing two amide groups
 Diamide, a synonym for tetramethylazodicarboxamide
 Diamide insecticides, a subclass of ryanoid insecticides